María Romary Rifka González (born 23 December 1970 in Poza Rica, Veracruz) is a Mexican high jumper. She is married to track & field athlete, Alejandro Cárdenas. Her personal best jump is 1.97 metres, achieved in April 2004 in Xalapa. This is the current Mexican record.

Achievements

References

External links

1970 births
Living people
Mexican female high jumpers
Athletes (track and field) at the 2003 Pan American Games
Athletes (track and field) at the 2004 Summer Olympics
Athletes (track and field) at the 2007 Pan American Games
Athletes (track and field) at the 2008 Summer Olympics
Athletes (track and field) at the 2011 Pan American Games
Olympic athletes of Mexico
Sportspeople from Veracruz
Mexican people of Jewish descent
People from Poza Rica
Pan American Games gold medalists for Mexico
Pan American Games silver medalists for Mexico
Pan American Games medalists in athletics (track and field)
Central American and Caribbean Games silver medalists for Mexico
Central American and Caribbean Games bronze medalists for Mexico
Competitors at the 2002 Central American and Caribbean Games
Competitors at the 2010 Central American and Caribbean Games
Central American and Caribbean Games medalists in athletics
Medalists at the 2003 Pan American Games
Medalists at the 2007 Pan American Games
Medalists at the 2011 Pan American Games